Tristana is a novel by Spanish author Benito Pérez Galdós, first published in 1892.

A 1970 film based on the novel was directed by Luis Buñuel.

References

Novels by Benito Pérez Galdós
1892 novels
19th-century Spanish novels
Spanish novels adapted into films